Meza indusiata, the snowy missile, is a butterfly in the family Hesperiidae. It is found in Senegal, Guinea-Bissau, Sierra Leone, Liberia, Ivory Coast, Ghana, Nigeria, Cameroon, Gabon, the Republic of the Congo, Angola, the Democratic Republic of the Congo and Uganda. The habitat consists of forests.

The larvae feed on Hugonia platysepala.

References

Butterflies described in 1891
Erionotini
Butterflies of Africa